{{Speciesbox 
| name = Silver hake
| image = Merluccius bilinearis.jpg
| status = NT
| status_system = IUCN3.1
| status_ref = 
| taxon = Merluccius bilinearis
| authority = (Mitchill, 1814)
| synonyms = *Stomodon bilinearis Mitchill, 1814 
}}
The silver hake, Atlantic hake, or New England hake (Merluccius bilinearis) is a merluccid hake of the genus Merluccius'', found in the northwest Atlantic Ocean. It is highly predatory and typically feeds on fish and crustaceans.

Appearance
The silver hake is a long, thin species with a protruding lower jaw and two dorsal fins. This hake is named as such for its silvery coloring, while darker dorsally.

Occurrence 
It is found along the eastern coast of Canada and United States, as well as in the Bahamas, but it is most common between Newfoundland and South Carolina.

References 

 An Annotated and Illustrated Catalogue of Cods, Hakes, Grenadiers and other Gadiform Fishes Known to Date.Daniel M.Cohen Tadashi Inada Tomio Iwamoto Nadia Scialabba 1990.  FAO Fisheries Synopsis. No. 125, Vol.10. Rome, FAO. 1990. 442p.

Merluccius
Fish described in 1814